The Bloch MB.700 was a French low-wing monoplane interceptor designed by Société des Avions Marcel Bloch during World War II.

Specifications

References

Bibliography

Single-engined tractor aircraft
World War II French fighter aircraft
Low-wing aircraft
1940s French fighter aircraft
MB.700
Aircraft first flown in 1940